Robert Stewart Craig (1867- 1930) was Dean of Clonmacnoise from 1923 until his death.

Craig was educated at Trinity College, Dublin and ordained in 1888. He spent his whole career at  Kilbride.

References

1867 births
1930 deaths
Irish Anglicans
Alumni of Trinity College Dublin
Deans of Clonmacnoise